Chen Xinhua (born 30 January 1960) is a former international table tennis player. He competed for Great Britain at the 1996 Summer Olympics.

Table tennis career
He is from China, but obtained the British citizenship in 1990. From 1978 to 1992 he won several medals in singles, doubles, and team events in the World Table Tennis Championships. He is also the winner of Table Tennis World Cup in 1985.

He also won an English Open title.

See also
 List of table tennis players
 List of World Table Tennis Championships medalists

References

Chinese male table tennis players
1960 births
Living people
English male table tennis players
Chinese emigrants to England
Asian Games medalists in table tennis
Table tennis players at the 1978 Asian Games
Table tennis players at the 1982 Asian Games
Table tennis players at the 1986 Asian Games
Medalists at the 1978 Asian Games
Medalists at the 1982 Asian Games
Medalists at the 1986 Asian Games
Asian Games gold medalists for China
Asian Games silver medalists for China
Asian Games bronze medalists for China
Naturalised citizens of the United Kingdom
Table tennis players from Fujian
People from Fu'an
Naturalised table tennis players
Table tennis players at the 1996 Summer Olympics
Olympic table tennis players of Great Britain